This is a list of the Annelida recorded from Ireland.
 
In Ireland the number of species is:
 Class Polychaeta 404 species
 Class Clitellata
 Subclass Oligochaeta 179 species
 Subclass Hirudinea 32 species 

Taxonomy Here the leeches and oligochaetes are placed together in the Class Clitellata. The marine Polychaeta are ranked as a Class. These  groups (and the Annelida) may be monophyletic, paraphyletic or polyphyletic. (Rouse and Pleijel, 2001).

Order Phyllodocida

Family Chrysopetalidae
2 species

Family Pisionidae
First segment projects forward of the head. Pisione.

1 species

Family Aphroditidae
"Felt"-covered scale worms. Aphrodita, Laetmonice, Palmyra (Palmyridae)

4 species including
Aphrodita aculeata

Family Polynoidae

29 species including
Alentia gelatinosa 
Gattyana cirrosa
Lepidonotus squamatus

Family Pholoidae
Minute scale worms. Dorsal scales ringed. Pholoe, Pholoides images of Pholoidae

4 species

Family Sigalionidae
Scale worms (with dorsal scales) and compound neurosetae. Sigalion, Psammolyce, Sthenelais.

8 species including
Sigalion mathildae

Family Phyllodocidae
Active predators with leaf-like dorsal cirri, notopodia otherwise reduced. Phyllodoce, Eumida Eteone and many others.

38 species including
Eulalia viridis
Eteone foliosa
Eteone longa
Eumida sanguinea
Hesionura elongata
Phyllodoce lineata
Phyllodoce maculata
Phyllodoce rosea

Family Chaetopteridae
1 species
Chaetopterus variopedatus

Family Lacydoniidae
A small obscure family, perhaps with hesionid affinities. Short body and proboscis unarmed. Lacydonia.

1 species

Family Alciopidae
Slender pelagic forms with giant eyes. Vanadis, Alciopa.
 
3 species

Family Lopadorrhynchidae
Short pelagic forms. Lopadorrhynchus.

5 species

Family Typhloscolecidae
Transparent pelagic group with tapering bodies and foliaceous segmental cirri. Sagitella, Typhloscolex, Travisiopsis.

2 species

Family Tomopteridae
Flattened pelagic forms with long cirri on segment-two. Tomopteris

2 species

Family Glyceridae
Cylindrical forms with a conical prostomium and four jaws. Glycera, Hemipodus.

1 species
Glycera alba

Family Goniadidae
Similar to Glyceridae with the anterior parapodia uniramous, multiple jaw- pieces, and chevron structures on the proboscis. Goniada, Glycinde.

3 species

Family Sphaerodoridae
Dorsal rows of spherical tubercles. Sphaerodorum.

4 species

Family Hesionidae
10 species

Family Pilargidae
1 species

Family Syllidae
38 species including
Haplosyllis spongicola
Sphaerosyllis levantina
Syllis prolifera

Family Nereididae
10 species including
Alitta succinea
Alitta virens
Hediste diversicolor
Platynereis dumerilii
Eunereis longissima

Family Nephtyidae

11 species including
Nephtys cirrosa

Order Amphinomida

Family Amphinomidae
3 species

Family Euphrosinidae

Order Spintherida

Family Spintheridae

1 species

Order Eunicida

Family Onuphidae

1 species

Family Eunicidae
8 species

Family Lumbrineridae
A Eunicida group lacking notopodia and with reduced or absent dorsal head appendages. Lumbrineris, Ninoe, Lysarete.

5 species

Family Oenonidae
Similar to Lumbrineridae with long maxillary carriers. Arabella, Drilonereis, Oenone.

3 species

Family Dorvilleidae
A Eunicida group with multiple jaw elements. Dorvillea, Ophryotrocha

6 species including
Protodorvillea kefersteini

Order Orbiniida

Family Orbiniidae

3 species

Family Paraonidae
Resembling Spionidae (but unrelated). With or without a single antenna, with gills, and without palps. Paraonis, Aricidea.

13 species

Order Spionida

Family Apistobranchidae
1 species

Family Poecilochaetidae
Fragile forms with stiff parapodial lobes and multiple simple setal types. Poecilochaetus.

1 species

Family Spionidae
31 species including
Aonides paucibranchiata
Scolelepis bonnieri
Scolelepis squamata
Spiophanes bombyx

Family Magelonidae
Small forms with a shovel-like head and papillose palp pair. Magelona.

5 species

Family Cirratulidae
12 species including
Cirratulus cirratus

Order Cossurida

Family Cossuridae
Slender forms with a single median palp on dorsal side of one anterior setiger.

1 species

Order Terebellida

Family Flabelligeridae
Papillated body and cross-barred setae. Flabelligera, Diplocirrus, Brada.

4 species including
Diplocirrus glaucus
Diplocirrus incognitus

Family Acrocirridae
1 species

Order Capitellida

Family Capitellidae
9 species including
Heteromastus filiformis

Family Arenicolidae
3 species including
Arenicola marina

Family Maldanidae
Bamboo worms. Long and cylindrical and truncate at one or both ends. Most with long, cylindrical segments with a pair of nuchal slits and a median cephalic keel. Maldane, Axiothella, Rhodine, Nicomache.

10 species

Order Opheliida

Family Opheliidae
9 species including 
Ophelina acuminata
Thoracophelia flabellifera
Ophelia limacina

Family Scalibregmatidae
Maggot-like or anteriorly inflated group with a small T-shaped prostomium. Scalibregma, Hyboscolex.

4 species including
Scalibregma inflatum

Order Nerillida

Family Nerillidae
1 species
Nerilla antennata

Order Polygordiida

Family Polygordiidae
Elongate nematode-like forms without setae, and with a stiff frontal tentacle pair. Polygordius.

2 species

Order Protodrilida

Family Protodrilidae
Minute forms without setae and with a flexible tentacle pair (near-frontal, but separated). They live in spaces between sediment grains. Protodrilus.

1 species

Order Polychaeta incertae sedis
Dinophilus taeniatus

Family Saccocirridae

1 species

Order Oweniida

Family Oweniidae

2 species

Order Terebellida

Family Pectinariidae

3 species

Family Sabellariidae

3 species
including 
Sabellaria alveolata
Sabellaria spinulosa
Sabella spallanzanii

Family Ampharetidae
Forms with no posterior notosetae and usually with simple, transversely-arranged gills. Ampharete, Melinna

5 species including 
Ampharete acutifrons

Family Trichobranchidae
Resemble Terebellidae but have long-handled hooks. Terebellides.
 
2 species

Family Terebellidae

23 species
including
 Lanice conchilega
 Thelepus cincinnatus
 Lagis koreni

Order Sabellida

Family Sabellidae

19 species including 
Sabella pavonina

Family Serpulidae
8 species
including 
Janua pagenstecheri
Ficopomatus enigmaticus
Serpula vermicularis
Pomatoceros triqueter
Pomatoceros lamarckii

Family Spirorbidae
Small asymmetric fan worms with coiled calcareous tubes cemented to algae and rock. Spirorbis.

8 species
including
Spirorbis spirorbis

Order Myzostomida

Family Myzostomidae

1 species

Class Aphanoneura

Family Aeolosomatidae
Aeolosoma hemprichi 
Aeolosoma variegatum

Class Clitellata
Subclass Oligochaeta

Order Opisthopora

Family Acanthodrilidae

1 species

Family Octochaetidae

1 species

Family Lumbricidae

26 species  
Allolobophora chlorotica
Allolobophoridella eiseni
Aporrectodea caliginosa
Aporrectodea cupulifera
Aporrectodea icterica
Aporrectodea limicola
Aporrectodea longa
Aporrectodea rosea
Dendrobaena attemsi
Dendrobaena hortensis
Dendrobaena octaedra
Dendrobaena veneta
Dendrodrilus rubidus
Dendrodrilus subrubicundus
Eisenia fetida
Eisenia parva
Eiseniella tetraedra
Helodrilus oculatus
Lumbricus castaneus
Lumbricus festivus
Lumbricus friendi
Lumbricus rubellus
Lumbricus terrestris
Murchieona minuscula
Octolasion cyaneum
Octolasion lacteum
Satchellius mammalis

Order Enchytraeida

Family Enchytraeidae

96 species

Order Tubificida

Family Naididae

50 species

Order Lumbriculida

Family Lumbriculidae
5 species

Class Clitellata
Subclass Hirudinea

Order Arhynchobdellida

Family Erpobdellidae
5 species

Family Hirudinidae
1 species
Hirudo medicinalis

Order Rhynchobdellida

Family Glossiphoniidae

7 species

Family Ozobranchidae

2 species

Family Piscicolidae

17 species

References

Fauna Europaea
McIntosh, William Carmichael A monograph of the British marine annelids. London, The Ray society,1873/1900-1922/23.online
Bellan, G. (2001) Polychaeta in Costello, M.J. (2001).European register of marine species: a check-list of the marine species in Europe and a bibliography of guides to their identification. Collection Patrimoines Naturels.
P. J. Hayward and J. S. Ryland Eds., 1999 The Marine Fauna of the British Isles and North-West Europe Oxford University Press  
Howson, C.M. & Picton, B.E.(eds) 1997. The species directory of the marine fauna and flora of the British Isles and surrounding seas.Ulster Museum and The Marine Conservation Society, Belfast and Ross-on-Wye.
Fauvel P., 1923. Polychètes errantes. Faune de France  n° 5  488 p., 181 fig.PDF (25 Mo) (Identification)
Fauvel P., 1927. Polychètes sédentaires. Faune de France  n° 16  494 p., 152 fig.PDF (25 Mo) (Identification)
World Register of Marine Species Searchable for Irish list

External links
Bernard E. Picton and Christine C. Morrow Encyclopedia of Marine Life of Britain and Ireland
MarLIN Marine Life Information Network for Britain and Ireland.
 Roche C., Clarke S. & O’Connor B. (2005) Inventory of Irish marine wildlife publications. Irish Wildlife Manuals, No. 16. National Parks and Wildlife Service, Department of Environment, Heritage and Local Government, Dublin, Ireland.
Marine species identification portal
 Barnich, R Scale worms in British and Irish waters

Ireland, annelids
annelid
Annelids